Job's Passion (Ysurei 'Yov) is a play by Israeli playwright Hanoch Levin, based on the biblical story of Job, combined with elements of Christ's Passion.

The play was first staged in April 1981 at The Cameri Theater in Israel, under the direction of Levin himself and starring Yosef Carmon as Job. The first production was criticized since it included a scene of the naked Job crucified through his anus by Roman centurions and left thus for the remainder of the play. Miriam Glazer-Ta'asa, Israel's Deputy Minister of Education and Culture at the time, claimed before the Knesset that the state should not fund theater where, "a naked man is hanging for twenty minutes with his genitals flailing about." Regardless of this criticism, Carmon was awarded the "David's Violin" Prize for his portrayal of Job.

Structure
The play is made up of seven Acts and an epilogue. within each section events are often repeated in cycles of three, thus Job is visited by three groups of beggars, three messengers of poverty, three messengers of death, and finally three friends.
Act I    –  The Beggars 
Act II   –  The Messengers of Poverty
Act III  –  The Executors
Act IV   –  The Messengers of Death 
Act V    –  The Friends
Act VI   –  The Soldiers
Act VII  –  The Entertainers
Act VIII –  The Dead

Productions
The play has been translated into English, French, German and Swedish.
 1981 - Cameri Theater (Tel Aviv, Israel) - directed by Hanoch Levin
 2006 - Theater for the New City (New York City, New York) - translated by Shay K. Azoulay; directed by David Paul Willinger
 2011 - The Jewish Theater (Stockholm, Sweden) - directed by Philip Zandén

External links
 Job and Jesus Combine to Overcome - New York Times Review of the 2006 production of the play at Theater for the New City.

1981 plays
Israeli plays